The Delegation of the European Union to the United Kingdom, formerly known as Representative of the European Union (specifically  the Representative of the European Commission and the Representative of the European Parliament) in London are the diplomatic missions of the European Commission and the European Parliament in the United Kingdom.

They are both located in Europa House, 32 Smith Square. The building was formerly the Conservative Party's Central Office from the late 1950s until 2004 and was famous as the place where the Conservatives planned and celebrated their election victories. It was then left vacant until 2009 when the EU chose it as their new London office, along with a new personalised postcode – SW1P 3EU. There was some criticism of the amount spent by the EU in acquiring and updating the interior of the building, with £20 million spent on purchasing the property and £5 million on revamping the building. It allegedly included the installation of bomb and bullet-proof windows.

As a result of the United Kingdom's withdrawal from the European Union on 31 January 2020, the Representative of the European Union was replaced by the Delegation of the European Union to the United Kingdom 

Since February 2020, the Ambassador of the Delegation of the EU to the UK has been João Vale de Almeida. The representative is referred to as ambassador, however in the United Kingdom full diplomatic status is only given to representatives of sovereign states.

Gallery

See also 
 European Union–United Kingdom relations

References

External links
Official site of the Delegation of the EU to the UK
Official site of the European Parliament office
Europa (EU official website) -UK - Brexit 

European Union
Diplomatic missions of the European Union
United Kingdom and the European Union
Buildings and structures in the City of Westminster
2020 establishments in the United Kingdom